Dravido-Koreanic, sometimes Dravido-Koreo-Japonic, is an abandoned proposal linking the Dravidian languages to Korean and (in some versions) to Japanese. A genetic link between the Dravidian languages and Korean was first hypothesized by Homer B. Hulbert in 1905. In his book The Origin of the Japanese Language (1970), Susumu Ōno proposed a layer of Dravidian (specifically Tamil) vocabulary in both Korean and Japanese. Morgan E. Clippinger gave a detailed comparison of Korean and Dravidian vocabulary in his article "Korean and Dravidian: Lexical Evidence for an Old Theory" (1984), but there has been little interest in the idea since the 1980s.

Recognition of language similarities
Similarities between the Dravidian languages and Korean were first noted by French missionaries in Korea. In 1905, Homer B. Hulbert wrote a comparative grammar of Korean and Dravidian in which he hypothesized a genetic connection between the two. Later, Susumu Ōno caused a stir in Japan with his theory that Tamil constituted a lexical stratum of both Korean and Japanese, which was widely publicized in the following years but was quickly abandoned. However, Clippinger applied the comparative method systematically to Middle Korean forms and reconstructed Dravidian forms. Lee Ki-Moon, Professor Emeritus at Seoul National University, argued in 2011 that Clippinger's conclusion should be revisited. According to Homer B. Hulbert, many of the names of ancient cities of southern Korea were the exact counterpart of Dravidian words. For example, the Karak Kingdom of King Suro was named after the proto-Dravidian meaning fish.

The Samguk yusa describes Heo Hwang-ok, who was the first queen of Geumgwan Gaya—a statelet of the Gaya confederacy—as coming from India's Ayuta or Ay (Kanyakumari) in Tamil Nadu. Since the Samguk yusa was compiled in the 12th century, and contains mythical narratives, it is not strong evidence. However, contact with Tamil merchants and a limited inflow of immigrants may have influenced the formation of the Gaya confederacy.

In 2011, Jung Nam Kim, president of the Korean Society of Tamil Studies, mentioned that the similarities between Korean and Dravidian are strong, but he also said that this does not prove a genetic link between Dravidian and Korean, and that more research needs to be done.

Arguments
Susumu Ōno, and Homer B. Hulbert propose that early Dravidian people, especially Tamils, migrated to the Korean peninsula and Japan. Hulbert based his theories of language relationships and associated migration patterns on the Turanian language hypothesis, which has been obsolete since the early 20th century. Morgan E. Clippinger presents 408 cognates and about 60 phonological correspondences. Clippinger found that some cognates were closer than others leading him to speculate a genetic link which was reinforced by a later migration. The Japanese professor Tsutomu Kambe found more than 500 similar cognates between Tamil and Japanese. There are two basic common features:
 all three languages are agglutinative,
 all three follow SOV word order, and consequently  modifiers always precede modified words and particles are post-positional.

However, typological similarities such as these could easily be due to chance; agglutinative languages are quite common, and half of the languages in the world follow SOV word order. The lack of a statistically significant number of cognates and the lack of anthropological and genetic links can be adduced to dismiss this proposal.

Comparative linguist Kang Gil-un identifies 1300 Dravidian Tamil cognates in Korean. He suggests that Korean is probably related to the Nivkh language and influenced by Tamil.

List of potential Korean-Tamil cognates

Personal pronouns

Kinship

Others

References

Works cited

External links

Proposed language families
Tamil language
Dravidian languages
Japanese language
Korean language